Garfield County Regional Airport  is a county-owned public-use airport in Garfield County, Colorado, United States. It is located three nautical miles (6 km) east of the central business district of Rifle, Colorado. According to the FAA's National Plan of Integrated Airport Systems for 2009–2013, it is categorized as a general aviation facility.

Facilities and aircraft 
It has one runway designated 8/26 with an asphalt surface measuring 7,011 by 100 feet (2,137 x 30 m).

For the 12-month period ending June 4, 2008, the airport had 7,105 aircraft operations, an average of 19 per day: 83% general aviation, 16% air taxi, 1% scheduled commercial, and <1% military. At that time there were 60 aircraft based at this airport: 70% single-engine, 13% multi-engine, 12% jet, 2% helicopter and 3% glider.

Airline and Destinations

Passenger

References

External links 
 Garfield County Regional Airport
 Garfield County Regional Airport (RIL) at Colorado DOT
 Atlantic Aviation, the fixed-base operator (FBO)
 Aerial image as of 20 September 1993 from USGS The National Map
 

Airports in Colorado
Transportation buildings and structures in Garfield County, Colorado